Leuciscus vorax, sometimes known as the Tigris asp or Mesopotamian asp, is a freshwater fish of the Cyprinid family. It is native to the Tigris-Euphrates basin and Orontes River in Iran, Iraq, Syria, and Turkey.

References

 

Leuciscus
Freshwater fish of Asia
Fish described in 1843